Patrick Moran may refer to:

Patrick Moran (bishop) (1823–1895), priest and bishop in South Africa and New Zealand
Patrick Moran (Irish republican) (1888–1921), one of The Forgotten Ten
Patrick Moran (musician) (born 1975), Canadian musician
Francis Moran (cardinal) (Patrick Francis Moran, 1830–1911), Irish-Australian Catholic archbishop and cardinal
Pat Moran (1876–1924), American baseball player
P. A. P. Moran (Patrick Alfred Pierce Moran, 1917–1988), Australian statistician
Pat Moran (rugby league)

See also
Paddy Moran (disambiguation)
Pat Moran McCoy, jazz pianist